The Collection may refer to:

 The Collection (Lincolnshire), a county museum and gallery in Lincolnshire, England

Film, television and theatre 
 The Collection (film), the 2012 sequel to the 2009 film The Collector
 "The Collection" (30 Rock), a 2007 episode of 30 Rock
 "The Collection" (Justified), a 2010 episode of Justified
 "The Collection" (The Twilight Zone), an episode of The Twilight Zone (2002 revival)
 The Collection (TV series), a 2016 Franco-British web-television series
 The Collection (play), a 1961 play by Harold Pinter

Music

Albums 
 The Collection (98 Degrees album), 2002
 The Collection (ABC album), 1996
 The Collection (Ace of Base album), 2002
 The Collection (Accept album), 1991
 The Collection (Alanis Morissette album), 2005
 The Collection (Alisha's Attic album), 2003
 The Collection (Amanda Lear album), 1991
 The Collection (Amy Grant album), 1986
 The Collection (Anthrax album), 2002
 The Collection (Atomic Kitten album), 2005
 The Collection (1993 Baccara album)
 The Collection (1998 Baccara album)
 The Collection (Bad Manners album), 1998
 The Collection (Barry White album), 1988
 The Collection (Belinda Carlisle album), 2014
 The Collection (Beverley Knight album), 2009
 The Collection (Black Sabbath album), 1992
 The Collection (1993 Blood, Sweat & Tears album), 1993
 The Collection (Blue album), 2007
 The Collection (Bone Thugs-N-Harmony album), two volumes, released 1998 and 2000
 The Collection (1991 Boney M. album)
 The Collection (Bonnie Tyler album), 2013
 The Collection (Camel album), 1985
 The Collection (Caroline's Spine album), 2006
 The Collection (Cast album), 2004
 The Collection (Clannad album), 1990
 The Collection (David Bowie album), 2005
 The Collection (Disturbed album), 2012
 The Collection (Divinyls album), 1994
 The Collection (Dolly Parton album), 1999
 The Collection (Donovan album), 1990
 The Collection (Earth, Wind & Fire album), 1986
 The Collection (Frank Sinatra album), 2011
 The Collection (Girlschool album), 1998
 The Collection (Gun album), 2003
 The Collection (Hawkwind album 1986)
 The Collection (Hawkwind album 2006)
 The Collection (Honeyz album), 2006
 The Collection (Hugh Masekela album), 2003
 The Collection (James album), 2004
 The Collection (Kenny G album), 1993
 The Collection (Martine McCutcheon album), 2012
 The Collection (Michael Jackson album), 2009
 The Collection ('N Sync album), 2010
 The Collection (New Model Army album), 2004
 The Collection (Ocean Colour Scene album), 2007
 The Collection (Quiet Riot album), 2000
 The Collection (Samantha Mumba album), 2006
 The Collection (Sandie Shaw album), 2007
 The Collection (Shed Seven album), 2004
 The Collection (Sonata Arctica compilation album), 2006
 The Collection (Spandau Ballet album), 1999
 The Collection (Steppenwolf album), 2003
 The Collection (Shakin' Stevens album), 2005
 The Collection (Strawbs album), 2002
 The Collection (Talk Talk album), 2000
 The Collection (Tommy Fleming album), 2003
 The Collection (Toto box set), 2008
 The Collection (Ugly Kid Joe album), 2002
 The Collection (Ultravox album), 1984
 The Collection (Vangelis album), 2012
 The Collection (Wishbone Ash album), 2003
 The Collection (Whitney Houston album), a 5-CD box set released 2010
 The Collection (Yanni album), 2006
 The Collection 1977–1982, by The Stranglers, 1982
 The Collection 1982–1988, by Céline Dion, 1997
 The Collection: Simon & Garfunkel, 2007
 The Collection 3.0, by Mina, 2015
 The Collection, by Boney M., 2008
 The Collection, by Bruce Springsteen, 2004
 The Collection, by Dan Reed Network, 2002
 The Collection, by Honeyz, 2006
 The Collection, by Nik Kershaw, 1991
 The Collection, by Synæsthesia, 2001
 Angel: The Collection, 2000
 The Beatles: The Collection, 1982
 Extreme – The Collection, 2002
 Jamelia – The Collection, 2009
 Lifetime: The Collection, by The New Tony Williams Lifetime, 1992

DVDs 
 The Collection (Earth, Wind & Fire DVD), 2005
 The Collection (TNT DVD), 2005

See also 
 
 A Collection (disambiguation)
 Collection (disambiguation)